Pará Gavião is part of the Timbira (Northern Jê) dialect cluster of Brazil.

Varieties
Linguistic varieties of Gavião include:

Krĩkatí, spoken in Terra Indígena Krikati, Maranhão
Pykobjê, 600 speakers in Terra Indígena Governador close to Amarante, Maranhão
Parkatêjê, 12 speakers in Terra Indígena Mãe Maria, Bom Jesus do Tocantins, Pará
Kỳikatêjê, 9 speakers in Terra Indígena Mãe Maria, Bom Jesus do Tocantins, Pará

See Timbira language for details.

References

Jê languages
Languages of Brazil